Christian Tiffert (born 18 February 1982) is a German football manager and a former midfielder. He is the manager of Chemnitzer FC.

Career

1. FC Kaiserslautern

On 8 April 2010, he signed with 1. FC Kaiserslautern for the 2010–11 Bundesliga season. During his time with Kaiserslautern, Tiffert led the Bundesliga in assists with 17 in the 2010–11 season.

Seattle Sounders FC
Tiffert was signed as a Designated Player for Major League Soccer club Seattle Sounders FC on 27 July 2012, confirming earlier interest and attendance during a game against Sporting Kansas City on 20 June. He replaced Uruguayan international Álvaro Fernández, who was traded to the Chicago Fire. He made his debut on 5 August 2012, playing for 26 minutes during a 4–0 victory over the Los Angeles Galaxy, replacing Brad Evans in front of an attendance of 61,000 at CenturyLink Field. Tiffert started throughout the Sounders' games in August, including a loss on penalties to Sporting Kansas City in the U.S. Open Cup Final, including a saved penalty against Tiffert. The German midfielder provided his first assist for the Sounders during 6–2 win over C.D. Chivas USA, crossing into the path of a header from Sammy Ochoa, at the Home Depot Center on 25 August. Tiffert's free kick to Eddie Johnson gave him a second career assist for the Sounders, over Chivas USA at home on 8 September. Tiffert played for four minutes against Caledonia AIA in Trinidad and Tobago in the CONCACAF Champions League on 31 August. He was unused during a 1–1 draw with the Portland Timbers due to an ankle injury the week before. Tiffert returned against the San Jose Earthquakes on 22 September and Tiffert started the remaining games of the season, recording his third career assist for the Sounders against F.C. Dallas for Brad Evans after a quick free kick from Fredy Montero on 21 October. Tiffert started all four games during the Sounders' MLS Cup Playoff campaign and recorded an assist for defender Zach Scott from a corner kick during a 2–1 win over the Los Angeles Galaxy on 18 November in the Conference Finals, however the Sounders lost 4–2 on aggregate. Tiffert finished his first MLS season with 18 total appearances and 3 assists. He was bought-out of his contract by the club on 2 March 2013.

Erzgebirge Aue
In November 2017, Tiffert agreed a contract with Erzgebirge Aue which would keep at the club until 2019. He had been at the club since 2015.

Coaching career
Tiffert retired at the end of the 2018–19 season and became a part of the technical staff of Chemnitzer FC in July 2019. On 1 March 2022, Tiffert was promoted to the position of manager by Chemnitzer FC until the end of the season. His first match was a 4–1 win against FSV Luckenwalde. Chemnitzer FC finished the 2021–22 Regionalliga Nordost season in fifth place. Chemnitzer FC started the 2022–23 season with a 2–1 loss in the DFB-Pokal.

Career statistics

Coaching record

Honours
VfB Stuttgart
UEFA Intertoto Cup: 2002

References

External links
 
 
 

1982 births
Living people
Sportspeople from Halle (Saale)
German footballers
Germany youth international footballers
Germany under-21 international footballers
German expatriate footballers
Bundesliga players
Austrian Football Bundesliga players
2. Bundesliga players
Association football midfielders
Tennis Borussia Berlin players
VfB Stuttgart players
VfB Stuttgart II players
FC Red Bull Salzburg players
MSV Duisburg players
MSV Duisburg II players
1. FC Kaiserslautern players
Seattle Sounders FC players
VfL Bochum players
FC Erzgebirge Aue players
Hallescher FC players
Expatriate footballers in Austria
Expatriate soccer players in the United States
Major League Soccer players
Designated Players (MLS)
3. Liga players
Footballers from Saxony-Anhalt
German football managers
Chemnitzer FC managers